Troy Bodine (born June 21, 1963) is a former Canadian football quarterback in the Canadian Football League who played for the Ottawa Rough Riders. He played college football for the Cincinnati Bearcats.

References

1963 births
Living people
American football quarterbacks
Canadian football quarterbacks
Ottawa Rough Riders players
Cincinnati Bearcats football players